Megatarsodes is a genus of moths of the family Crambidae. It contains only one species, Megatarsodes baltealis, which is found in Madagascar.

References

Natural History Museum Lepidoptera genus database

Pyraustinae
Crambidae genera
Monotypic moth genera